Longobardi is a town and comune in the province of Cosenza, part of the Calabria region of southern Italy.  It is located between the Tyrrhenian Sea and the Monte Cocuzzo, one of the highest peaks in the area.

Main sights include the church of St. Francis, the Collegiata and the Palazzo Pellegrini with a notable staircase.

Notable people
 Saint Nicola Saggio, Minim, (1650-1709) who was canonized on the 23 November 2014

References

External links 
Official website 
Video on http://www.telecosenza.it

Cities and towns in Calabria
Populated coastal places in Italy